The L700 is a commercial station wagon from Honda. Produced for only eleven months beginning in October 1965, it shared the S600 roadster's mechanicals and used a bored out version of that car's high-tech inline-four engine. At 687 cc, the DOHC engine produced 52 hp (39 kW) with twin side-draft carburettors.

The L700 was designed for commercial deliveries and was referred to by Honda as a light van, but it appeared as a conventional station wagon, seating five. Only a four-speed manual transmission was available, the front suspension was an independent MacPherson struts while the rear was a conventional leaf sprung live axle. Two models were built — the basic LA700 and better-equipped LM700. A third version, called the Honda P700 was a small pick-up truck version, with an exposed load bay and a standard cab situated behind the engine, using the same chassis as the L700 (front engine, rear drive). It appeared a month after the L700. 12,763 L700 and 1328 P700 were built.

L800

The L700 was replaced in 1966 by the L800. Basically an L700 with a 58 hp (43 kW) 791 cc engine, the L800 was introduced at the Tokyo Motor Show in 1966. The engine came from the S800 roadster but used a single side-draft carburettor. It was available in LA and LM trim levels like the L700, and about 12,500 were produced through 1967. The "L" prefix is a naming reference to lorry, from the British word for "truck." 7275 L800 were built, alongside 1079 P800. In total, 22,445 of all L- and P-series models were built; very few remain.

References

 

L700

Cars introduced in 1965